Shyam Mukherjee is a film editor from India. He is a brother of writer, director, producer Ram Mukherjee, and a son of producer Sashadhar Mukherjee, part of the Mukherjee-Samarth family.

Filmography

Shaym Mukherjee edited the following films:

 Beti No. 1 (2000) 
 Zulm-O-Sitam (1998)
 Sher-E-Hindustan (1997)
 Muqadar (1996)
 Daanveer (1996)
 Tahqiqaat (1993)
 Zakhmi Sipahi (1992)
 Ganga Tere Desh Mein (1988) 
 Surakksha (1979)

References

External links

Hindi film editors
Living people
Year of birth missing (living people)